Vivian E. Cook (born May 23, 1937) represents District 32 in the New York State Assembly, which comprises New York City's Queens borough neighborhoods of Jamaica Estates, Rochdale Village, and Springfield.

A native of Rock Hill, South Carolina, Cook has served as a District Leader in Queens for over 25 years. As of January 2019, Cook is the County Committee Chair of the Queens County Democratic Committee.

Cook was first elected to the State Assembly in 1990. She was appointed Chairwoman of the Task Force on Food and the Farm and Nutrition Policy in 2000. As of June 2019, Cook serves as Chair of the Assembly Committee on Standing Committees. Cook ran uncontested in the 2008 and 2010 general elections.

In 2010, the New York Daily News reported that Cook was among the Assembly members that refused to disclose her outside income.

In December 2018, a former staffer filed a discrimination lawsuit accusing Cook of being an abusive boss who used profanity and racial slurs.

References

External links
New York State Assembly Member Website
Biography: New York State Democratic Committee

1937 births
Living people
Democratic Party members of the New York State Assembly
African-American state legislators in New York (state)
African-American women in politics
Women state legislators in New York (state)
21st-century American politicians
21st-century American women politicians
21st-century African-American women
21st-century African-American politicians
20th-century African-American people
20th-century African-American women